Little River State Forest is an Alabama state forest in the counties of Escambia and Monroe. The forest had its beginnings in the 1930s, when the property was deeded to the state. In 1934, during the Great Depression, the Civilian Conservation Corps (CCC) began work to create a state park at the site. Many current structures date from the CCC period, including the office building, a cabin, pavilions, a nature trail, and a  lake. The site is managed and maintained by the Alabama Forestry Commission.

References

External links
U.S. Geological Survey Map at the U.S. Geological Survey Map Website. Retrieved January 8th, 2023.

Protected areas of Escambia County, Alabama
Protected areas established in 1934
Alabama state forests
Civilian Conservation Corps in Alabama